Rocky Ridge is the name of various places:

Australia
Rocky Ridge, Queensland, a rocky outcrop and archaeological site nicknamed the Gympie Pyramid

Canada
 Rocky Ridge, Calgary, a neighbourhood in Calgary, Alberta

United States
 Rocky Ridge, Maryland, an unincorporated community
 Rocky Ridge, Missouri, an unincorporated community in Sainte Genevieve County
 Rocky Ridge, Ohio, a village
 Rocky Ridge, Utah, a town